The University of Wisconsin–Green Bay, Manitowoc Campus or UW–Green Bay, Manitowoc Campus is a two-year campus of the University of Wisconsin System located in Manitowoc, Wisconsin. It is part of the University of Wisconsin–Green Bay. Enrollment was 525 in fall, 2014.

History
The University of Wisconsin System has had a presence in Manitowoc since 1933, when 26 students enrolled in a UW English class offered at the Vocational School located downtown on Clark Street. In July 2018 the UW System was restructured so that UW–Manitowoc became a UW–Green Bay campus. In August 2018 the name was officially changed to University of Wisconsin–Green Bay, Manitowoc Campus or UW–Green Bay, Manitowoc Campus.

Academics
The UW–Green Bay, Manitowoc Campus runs on the semester system. The school offers an Associate of Arts and Science Degree (60 credits), leading towards a bachelor's degree at many four-year colleges.

Annually, the enrollment is approximately 650 students. UW–Green Bay, Manitowoc Campus has about 45 faculty and instructional staff, as well as 30 administrative and support staff.

The UW–Green Bay, Manitowoc Campus is accredited by the North Central Association of Colleges and Schools.

Campus
The  campus, located on the south side of the city near Silver Creek Park and on the shore of Lake Michigan, was opened in 1962. The campus has seen two major additions: Hillside Hall (originally named West Hall) was opened in 1986, Lakeside Hall, which houses the theatre and music departments, was added in 2001. The University Theatre Company performs in this venue. The original building is now named Founders Hall.

Lakeside Hall features a 350-seat theatre, with an orchestra pit behind the stage and state-of-the-art sound, lighting and acoustic systems. It is used for plays, concerts and lectures. Additionally, the main academic lecture hall has been relocated to Hillside Hall from the original building.

Sports
The UW–Green Bay, Manitowoc Campus Blue Devils compete in the East Division of the Wisconsin Collegiate Conference. The program offers intercollegiate athletic opportunities in co-ed golf, as well as men's and women's basketball, tennis, and volleyball.

References

External links
 UW–Green Bay, Manitowoc Campus

University of Wisconsin-Green Bay, Manitowoc Campus
Education in Manitowoc County, Wisconsin
Educational institutions established in 1933
Buildings and structures in Manitowoc County, Wisconsin
1933 establishments in Wisconsin
Two-year colleges in the United States
Manitowic Campus
Manitowic